Krasnoyarsk State Medical University named after Professor V. F. Voyno-Yasenetsky (KrasSMU) (KrasGMU) (Krasnoyarsk Medical Academy) is a public university located in the city of Krasnoyarsk, Russia, and founded in 1942.

History
The Krasnoyarsk State Medical Institute (KSMI) was formed on November 21, 1942, by the decision of the All-Union Committee for Higher School Affairs under the Council of People's Commissars of the USSR and the People's Commissariat of Health of the USSR by merging the Voronezh Dental Institute evacuated to Krasnoyarsk, parts of the 1st Leningrad Medical Institute and the 2nd Leningrad Medical Institute, as well as the Leningrad Pediatric Institute and the Leningrad Dental Institute.

During the Great Patriotic War, the first students of the university were taught by the saint, surgeon, professor V.F. Voyno-Yasenetsky.

There were fifty-one doctors in the first graduation of KSMI students.
In 1958, a pediatric faculty was added to the only training program - general medicine. In 1961, the Faculty of Pediatrics was opened, in 1978 - the Faculty of Dentistry.
In 1992–2013, the Faculty of Higher Nursing Education operated at KSMI.
In 1995, the institute was renamed the Krasnoyarsk State Medical Academy (KrasGMA).
In 2006, the Faculty of Pharmacy was opened, in 2010 - the Faculty of Clinical Psychology, in 2011 - the Faculty of Medical Cybernetics.
In 2007, the Medical Academy was named after Professor Valentin Feliksovich Voyno-Yasenetsky, and in 2008 - the status of a medical university.

Description

Professor V.F. Voino-Yasenetsky Krasnoyarsk State Medical University is situated in the city of Krasnoyarsk, the administrative center of the Krasnoyarsk Region, the second largest region of the Russian Federation. It is located in the center of the country on the banks of the Yenisei river and surrounded by mountains. The population of Krasnoyarsk is more than one million people. It is a modern city with a 400-year history, a cultural, industrial and university center of Siberia.

The university campus is situated in the historic center of the city where almost 400 years ago Krasnoyarsk was founded.The educational programs are realized in the following specialties:
 General medicine (Russian Language)
 General medicine (English Language) 
 Pediatrics
 Stomatology
 Pharmacy
 Medical cybernetics 
 Clinical psychology 
Classes of the Russian language for foreign students are organized at the university. Starting from 2019, the university launches educational programs for foreign students in English.

At the university there are 10 scientific-educational centers, several scientific schools recognized in the Russian Federation and abroad. The students have access to modern classrooms and training facilities, computer centers, research laboratories, a linguistic center, a state-of-the-art center of simulation medical training where our students master practical skills using virtual training devices and humanized robots.

University clinics and research

The university is engaged in joint scientific and educational programs with other universities and scientific centers of Moscow, Saint-Petersburg, Saratov,Tomsk, Novosibirsk, as well as with our partners from Japan, France, Italy,Germany and other countries. For more than 25 years the university has been fulfilling large-scale programs of student exchange with Japanese universities.Professionalism, talent and spiritual virtue are the three pillars that drive teachers, students and graduates of Kras SMU. We possess all resources to feel confident about the future and make substantial contribution to the creation of modern appearance of the temple of science, education and culture.
 In campus clinics:
Internal medicine
Cardiology
Pulmonology
Endocrinology
Pediatrics
Neurology
Poly clinic
Diagnostic center
OG
Surgery (general)
Gastro
Trauma
Urology
Psychiatrics
Dermatology
ICU
Apart this university has more than 15 hospitals and polyclinics around Krasnoyarsk city.

Research
Krasnoyarsk for the first time in Russia brought together specialists in the field of aptamer research

Recognition 
The university has gained recognition from the following international organizations:

 World Health Organization (WHO);
 Foundation for Advancement of International Medical Education and Research (FAIMER);
 National Medical Commission (Medical Council of India);
 Geneva Foundation for Medical Education and Research (GFMER)
 Educational Commission for Foreign Medical Graduates (ECFMG);
 Nursing and Midwifery Council (NMC);
 General Medical Council (GMC);
 Sri Lanka Medical Council (SLMC) - awaiting for listing;
 NEICON MEMBER

References

External links 
 Official site
 Siberian Medical Review

Universities in Krasnoyarsk Krai
Educational institutions established in 1942
Krasnoyarsk
1942 establishments in Russia
Medical schools in Russia
Public universities and colleges in Russia